The 2013–14 Hannover 96 season is the 118th season in the club's football history. In 2013–14 the club plays in the Bundesliga, the premier tier of German football. It is the club's eleventh season in this league, having been promoted from the 2. Bundesliga in 2002.

Off-season
Hannover made five new signings over the summer period—Salif Sané from Nancy, Edgar Prib from Greuther Fürth, Leonardo Bittencourt from Borussia Dortmund, and youngsters Konstantin Fuhry from Stuttgart under-19's and Florian Ballas from Nürnberg II.

Hannover also lost Sérgio Pinto to Levante and both Mohammed Abdellaoue and Konstantin Rausch to Stuttgart. Additionally, Mario Eggimann left to join Union Berlin, Sofian Chahed left on a free transfer and Johan Djourou returned to Arsenal before signing on loan at rivals Hamburger SV.

During the winter break, rumours arose regarding the situation of manager Mirko Slomka due to the team's recent poor form, and on 27 December, he was fired.

As per the norm for German football teams, during the mid-season break, the teams have training camps in countries with warmer winter climates. This year, Hannover 96 will be in Belek, Turkey, between 9 January and 17 January, along with Hertha BSC and Borussia Mönchengladbach, prior to the Niedersaschen derby at Wolfsburg on 25 January.

On 31 December 2013, it was announced that Turkish manager Tayfun Korkut had become the new manager of Hannover on a contract running until 30 June 2016. He is the second Turkish coach to manage in the Bundesliga.

Fixtures

Pre-season

During the season

Post-season

Bundesliga

League fixtures and results

League table

DFB-Pokal
Hannover entered the 2013–14 DFB Pokal with an away game against Victoria Hamburg on Sunday 4 August 2013.

Squad

Squad information

Season statistics
As of 12 April 2013

|-
! colspan="12" style="background:#dcdcdc; text-align:center"| Goalkeepers

|-
! colspan="12" style="background:#dcdcdc; text-align:center"| Defenders

|-
! colspan="12" style="background:#dcdcdc; text-align:center"| Midfielders

|-
! colspan="12" style="background:#dcdcdc; text-align:center"| Forwards

|}

Results summary

Points breakdown

Points at home: 25 
Points away from home: 10 

Points against promoted teams: 5

6 points: Wolfsburg, Eintracht Frankfurt
4 points: vs. Hertha BSC, Augsburg
3 points: vs. Schalke 04, Mainz 05, Borussia Mönchengladbach, Hamburg
2 points:
1 point: vs. Eintracht Braunschweig, Nürnberg, Bayer Leverkusen
0 points: vs. Bayern Munich, Borussia Dortmund, 1899 Hoffenheim, Werder Bremen, Stuttgart, Freiburg

Biggest & smallest
Biggest home win: 4 – 1 vs. 1. Mainz 05, 31 August 2013 
Biggest home defeat: 0 – 4 vs. Bayern Munich, 23 February 2014
Biggest away win: 1 – 3 vs. Wolfsburg, 25 January 2014 
Biggest away defeat: 3 – 0 vs. Borussia Mönchengladbach, 17 August 2013

Biggest home attendance: 49,000 vs. Schalke 04, 24 August 2013 
Smallest home attendance: 38,600 vs. Mainz 05, 31 August 2013 
Biggest away attendance: 80,645 vs. Borussia Dortmund, 19 October 2013 
Smallest away attendance: 4,787 vs. Victoria Hamburg, 4 August 2013

Results by match

Goal scorers

All competitions

2013–14 Bundesliga

2013–14 DFB-Pokal

|-  style="text-align:left; background:#dcdcdc;"
| colspan="12"|Last updated: 18 April 2014
|-

References

Hannover 96
Hannover 96 seasons